Neptune, New Jersey may refer to:

 Neptune Township, New Jersey
 Neptune City, New Jersey